USS Endion (SP-707) was a United States Navy patrol vessel in commission from 1917 to 1919.

Endion was built as a private motorboat of the same name in 1898. On 1 May 1917, the U.S. Navy purchased her for use as a section patrol boat during World War I. She was commissioned the same day as USS Endion (SP-707).

Assigned to the 1st Naval District in northern New England, Endion carried out patrol duties for the rest of World War I.

Endion was stricken from the Navy List on 6 October 1919 and subsequently sold.

References
 
 SP-704 Barbara at Department of the Navy Naval History and Heritage Command Online Library of Selected Images: U.S. Navy Ships -- Listed by Hull Number "SP" #s and "ID" #s -- World War I Era Patrol Vessels and other Acquired Ships and Craft numbered from SP-700 through SP-799
 NavSource Online: Section Patrol Craft Photo Archive Endion (SP 707)

Patrol vessels of the United States Navy
World War I patrol vessels of the United States
1898 ships